Emma Hunt (born April 1, 2003) is an American sport climber specializing in speed climbing, and holds the American women's speed record with 6.84 seconds, set at the IFSC Climbing World Cup in Edinburgh in September 2022.

Climbing career

Hunt finished second overall in speed at the 2022 IFSC Climbing World Cup and has four World Cup podium finishes overall. She finished seventh at the 2021 IFSC Climbing World Championships.

Hunt won her first senior event at the 2021 IFSC Pan-American Championships in Ibarra, Ecuador. She also won the gold medal in the women's speed event at the 2022 World Games in July 2022.

Personal life
Hunt graduated a year early from high school and began attending Kennesaw State University in 2020.

See also
List of grade milestones in rock climbing
History of rock climbing
Rankings of most career IFSC gold medals

References

External links 

2003 births
Living people
World Games gold medalists
Competitors at the 2022 World Games
21st-century American women
Sportspeople from Georgia (U.S. state)
People from Woodstock, Georgia
Kennesaw State University people
IFSC Climbing World Cup overall medalists
Speed climbers